LIVE EXECUTION is a live album by Babyland, released on January 20, 2013, by Mattress Recordings.

Reception
I Die:You Die said "there's enough grit and crowd noise to separate it from the albums we know so well, but it doesn’t ever feel removed from the moment it was recorded, the energy and effort conveyed with each strike of an oil drum and Dan’s increasingly hoarse and ragged voice on climactic renditions of "Gehry" and "You Will Never Have It"."

Track listing

Personnel
Adapted from the LIVE EXECUTION liner notes.

Babyland
 Dan Gatto – vocals, instruments
 Michael Smith – percussion

Production and design
 Jean Béraud – cover art, illustrations
 Larry Goetz – recording, mixing

Release history

References

External links 
 LIVE EXECUTION at Discogs (list of releases)
 LIVE EXECUTION at Bandcamp

2013 live albums
Babyland albums